Shidan (also Romanized as Shīdān and Sheydān; also known as Seyyedūn and Sīdun) is a village in Baraan-e Jonubi Rural District, in the Central District of Isfahan County, Isfahan Province, Iran. At the 2006 census, its population was 534, in 145 families.

References 

Populated places in Isfahan County